The Federal University of Rio Grande (FURG) is a public Brazilian university funded by the Brazilian federal government, located in the city of Rio Grande, Rio Grande do Sul, Brazil.

Formally established on October 21, 1969, it includes 18 departments providing 31 different undergraduate courses, as well as a number of graduate programs.

Degrees 

FURG provides five different types of degree: undergraduate (bachelor, teaching, and technology), graduate's specialization, residency (for undergraduate courses, such as medicine, teaching courses, nursing, and law), master's degree, and doctoral degree.

Undergraduate studies 

FURG teaching the following undergraduate courses in five different campi (located in the following cities: Rio Grande, São Lourenço do Sul, Santa Vitória do Palmar, Santo Antônio da Patrulha):

 Accounting sciences – bachelor's degree
 Administration – bachelor's degree
 Agroecology – bachelor's degree
 Agrochemistry – bachelor's degree
 Food industries – bachelor's degree
 Applied mathematics – bachelor's degree
 Archaeology – bachelor's degree
 Archival science – bachelor's degree
 Automation engineering – bachelor's degree
 Biochemical engineering – bachelor's degree 
 Biological science – both bachelor's degree and teaching degree
 Chemical engineering – bachelor's degree
 Chemistry – both bachelor's degree and teaching degree
 Civil engineering – bachelor's degree
 Civil engineering and management – bachelor's degree
 Port civil engineering – Bachelor's degree
 Computer engineering – bachelor's degree
 Cooperative management – technology degree
 Economics – bachelor's degree
 Environmental management – technology degree
 Environmental toxicology – technology degree
 Events – technology degree
 Exact sciences – teaching degree
 Field education – teaching degree
 Food engineering – bachelor's degree
 Geography – both bachelor's degree and teaching degree
 History – both bachelor's degree and teaching degree
 Hotel management – bachelor's degree
 Information systems – bachelor's degree
 International relations – bachelor's degree
 International trade – bachelor's degree
 Spanish, French or English – teaching degree
 Library science – bachelor's degree
 Mathematics – teaching degree
 Mechanical engineering – bachelor's degree
 Mechanical engineering and management – bachelor's degree
 Medicine – bachelor's degree
 Naval mechanical engineering – bachelor's degree
 Nursing – bachelor's degree
 Oceanology – bachelor's degree
 Pedagogy – teaching degree
 Physical education – teaching degree
 Physics – both bachelor's degree and teaching degree
 Production engineering – bachelor's degree
 Psychology – bachelor's degree
 Sciencies – teaching degree
 Tourism – bachelor's degree
 Visual arts – both bachelor's degree and teaching degree

Master's and doctoral degrees 

FURG teaching the following master's and doctoral degrees in two different campi (located in the following cities: Rio Grande, Brazil|Rio Grande and Santo Antônio da Patrulha):

 Accounting sciences – master's degree
 Administration – master's degree
 Agroindustrial systems and processes – master's degree
 Applied economics – master's degree
 Aquaculture – master's and doctoral degree
 Biological oceanography – master's and doctoral degree
 Biology of continental aquatic environments – master's and doctoral degree
 Chemical engineering – master's degree
 Coastal management – master's degree
 Computational modeling – master's and doctoral degree
 Computer engineering – master's degree
 Education – master's degree
 Environmental education – master's and doctoral degree
 Exact sciences teaching – master's degree
 Food science and engineering – master's and doctoral degree
 Geography – master's degree
 Health sciences – master's and doctoral degree
 History – master's degree
 Law and social justice – master's degree
 Letters – master's and doctoral degree
 Mathematics – master's degree
 Mechanical engineering – master's degree
 Nursing – master's and doctoral degree
 Ocean engineering – master's degree
 Oceanology – master's and doctoral degree
 Physics – master's degree
 Physics teaching – master's degree
 Physiological sciences – master's and doctoral degree
 Public health – master's degree
 Science education – master's and doctoral degree
 Technological and environmental chemistry – master's and doctoral degree

See also 
 Brazil University Rankings
 Universities and Higher Education in Brazil

References

External links 

 

Educational institutions established in 1969
1969 establishments in Brazil
Universities and colleges in Rio Grande do Sul
Federal universities of Brazil